Hassan Abshir Farah (June 20, 1945 – July 12, 2020) was a Somali politician. He previously served as mayor of Mogadishu and interior minister of Puntland. From November 12, 2001 to November 8, 2003, he was also prime minister of Somalia. Farah was an MP in the Federal Parliament of Somalia.

Biography
Farah was born in 1945 in the former Italian Somaliland. He hailed from Majeerteen subclan of Darod. Between 1961 and 1965, he attended secondary school in Mogadishu, the nation's capital. He spent the next two years at the Egyptian Military Academy in Cairo, Egypt. Between 1980 and 1986, Hassan also studied at the Somali National University, where he obtained a degree in Law.

Political career

Mayor of Mogadishu
Farah's political career began in 1969, when he was a junior member of the military junta that took control of Somalia in 1969 under Siad Barre. His first official role was working as vice district commissioner of Mogadishu. In the 1970s, Hassan was appointed mayor of Mogadishu. During this period, he worked with the National Security Service to have many opponents to the government arrested. He also served as governor of Shabeellaha Dhexe and Bakool, and as the Somali ambassador to Japan and Germany. While governor, he opposed the rising force of the Somali Salvation Democratic Front (SSDF), which resisted Siad Barre's rule.

Interior Minister of Puntland
In December 1999, acting as the Interior Minister of the autonomous northeastern Puntland region and serving under then-President of Puntland, Abdullahi Yusuf Ahmed, Farah ordered the eviction of three NGO workers, citing "unsatisfactory services" as reasons for their dismissal: Eddie Johns of United Nations Development Programme (UNDP) and United Nations Conference on Trade and Development, Remmelt Hummeyn of UNDP and Said Al-Naimari of UNICEF.

Prime Minister of the Transitional National Government (TNG)
Farah was prime minister in the Transitional National Government (TNG) of Somalia from November 12, 2001 until December 8, 2003, when then President Abdiqassim Salad Hassan held a session of parliament, which cast a vote of no confidence with regard to the Prime Minister and the Parliamentary Speaker at the time, Abdallah Derow Isaak.

During Farah's first month in office, which was a few months after the September 11 attacks in 2001, he said the United States would be welcome to deploy troops to Somalia for the first time since the withdrawal of US forces from the UN missions of the 1990s, and to help monitor terrorist activities in the country. He was referring to Al-Itihaad Al-Islamiya (AIAI), which the US did name as a terrorist organization. On December 15, 2001, he stated there were no members of Al-Qaeda in Somalia, though a rival warlord claimed there were 50 armed fighters of the terrorist organization who had entered the country. In any event, the United States did not deploy any troops to Somalia at the time.

He was the primary representative of the TNG at the October 2002 Somali Reconciliation Conference held in Eldoret, Kenya. However, those efforts failed to produce a lasting settlement, since the TNG was heavily contested by the rival Somalia Reconciliation and Restoration Council (SRRC). The Somali National Reconciliation Conference meetings of July 2003 finally settled problems between the TNG and the SRRC, but by then the TNG had lost most of its momentum and funding. The three-year mandate for the TNG officially ended in August 2003, but the organization continued to carry on between the formal date and the creation of the successor TNG of 2004. President Abdiqassim Salad removed the Prime Minister and the Parliamentary Speaker in August 2003; the no-confidence vote of the Parliament in December 2003 was undertaken to formalize the decision. Writing from Nairobi, Hassan Abshir and Abdallah Derow Isaak both said any attempts to extend the terms of the TNG were "unconstitutional."

Transitional Federal Government (TFG)
In 2004, Hassan Abshir Farah became the Fisheries Minister of the new Transitional Federal Government (TFG), which replaced the TNG. He was mostly active in the National Peace Process in the country. In late 2006, he secured a $55 million pirate-fighting contract with New York-based Top Cat Marine Security.

On August 1, 2006, Farah resigned along with seven other ministers, in protest at Prime Minister Ali Mohammed Ghedi's postponement of talks with the Islamic Courts Union (ICU). He said "We had no option but to resign because we believe if the talks are postponed again it will affect the reconciliation efforts".

Puntland presidential elections
In 2008, Farah launched a campaign to run for president of the autonomous Puntland state in the northeastern region's 2008 elections. Abdirahman Mohamud Farole was eventually elected to office in January of the following year.

Federal Parliament
Following the establishment of the Federal Government of Somalia in August 2012, Farah began serving as a legislator in the new Federal Parliament.

Death
Farah died from COVID-19 in Turkey in 2020.

See also 
Muhammad Ali Samatar
Muse Hassan Sheikh Sayid Abdulle

Notes

External links

Federal Parliament of Somalia – Hassan Abshir Farah

 
	 
 	 

1945 births
2020 deaths
21st-century prime ministers of Somalia
Ethnic Somali people
Egyptian Military Academy alumni
Somali National University alumni
Somalian Muslims
People from Mogadishu
Government ministers of Somalia
Members of the Transitional Federal Parliament
Puntland politicians
Deaths from the COVID-19 pandemic in Turkey
Mayors of Mogadishu